La duquesa del Tepetate ("The Duchess of Tepetate") is a 1951 Mexican film. It stars Sara García.

Cast
 Sara García - Chonita
 Abel Salazar - Enrique
Gloria Lozano - Isabel
 José Torvay - Don Simón
 Salvador Quiroz - Don Rodolfo
 Humberto Rodríguez - Dr. Manzanares
 Hernán Vera - Hotelero
 Fernando Torre Laphame - Ángel (as Fernando Torre L.)
 Lidia Franco - María
 Pedro Elviro - (as Pedro Elviro 'Pitouto')

External links
 

1951 films
1950s Spanish-language films
Mexican black-and-white films
1950s Mexican films